John Setuni Achuliwor was a Ghanaian politician and a member of the Third Parliament of the Fourth Republic representing the Navrongo Central Constituency in the Upper East Region of Ghana.

Early life and education
John was born in Navrongo Central in the Upper East Region of Ghana.

Politics
John was first elected into Parliament on the Ticket of the New Patriotic Party during the December 2000 Ghanaian General elections. He Polled 11,246 votes out of the 27,114 valid votes cast representing 41.50%. His constituency was a part of the 7 parliamentary seats out of 12 seats won by the New Patriotic Party in that election in the Upper East Region.The New Patriotic Party won a majority total of 99 parliamentary seats out of 200 seats. He was elected over Clement T. Bugase of the National Democratic Congress, Pwoawuvi J.Weguri of the Peoples National Convention Party, Kaguah A. Castor of the National Reform Party, Frank Awepuga of the Great Consolidated Political Party, Jennifer Anema of the Convention Peoples Party and Margaret A.Pungase of the United Ghana Movement. These secured 11,103, 3,284,604,353, 310 and 214 votes out of the total valid votes cast respectively. These were corresponding to 40.90%,12.10%, 2.20%, 1.30%,1.10% and 0.80% respectively of total valid votes cast.

Career
Achuliwor was a member of parliament (MP) for Navrongo Central and Deputy Minister of Communications and Technology. He worked at ActionAid, from 1993 to 1998, a non-governmental organisation in Ghana and The Gambia. He also was is an Agronomist by profession.

Death
Achuliwor died through a motor accident at Manhyia in the Ashanti Region on 29 January 2003. He was buried at Navrongo on Saturday, 15 March 2003.

Personal life
Achuliwor was married to Mrs Bridget Ify Achuliwor and together they had three children.

References

University of Cape Coast alumni
2003 deaths
People from Upper East Region
New Patriotic Party politicians
Alumni of the University of Manchester
University of Ibadan alumni
Ghanaian MPs 2001–2005
Agronomists
21st-century Ghanaian politicians